Heather O'Neill (born 1973) is a Canadian novelist, poet, short story writer, screenwriter and journalist, who published her debut novel, Lullabies for Little Criminals, in 2006. The novel was subsequently selected for the 2007 edition of Canada Reads, where it was championed by singer-songwriter John K. Samson. Lullabies won the competition. The book also won the Hugh MacLennan Prize for Fiction and was shortlisted for eight other major awards, including the Orange Prize for Fiction and the Governor General's Award and was longlisted for International Dublin Literary Award.

Lullabies for Little Criminals was a publishing sensation in Canada and went on to become an international bestseller. O'Neill was named by Chatelaine as one of the most influential women in Canada.

Biography
O'Neill was born in Montreal. Her father is from Montreal and her mother is of Southern American descent. O'Neill spent the first part of her childhood in Montreal. After her parents' divorce, she lived in the American South with her mother for several years before returning to Montreal to live with her father. She has lived in Montreal ever since. She was educated at Dawson College and McGill University. She has one daughter, Arizona, whom she raised as a single parent.

Work
O'Neill published her debut novel Lullabies for Little Criminals in 2006 and it immediately became a bestseller.

She published her second novel The Girl Who Was Saturday Night in 2014. It was shortlisted for the 2014 Scotiabank Giller Prize. It was also nominated for the Baileys Women's Prize for Fiction and the Encore Award.

Her short story collection, Daydreams of Angels, was published in 2015 and was shortlisted for the Scotiabank Giller Prize.

Her third novel The Lonely Hearts Hotel, was published in 2017 and won the Hugh MacLennan Prize for Fiction.

She has made contributions to The New York Times Magazine, The Guardian, This American Life, CBC Radio, Rookie Magazine, Elle, Chatelaine, the National Post, The Globe and Mail the Toronto Star, and The Walrus.

O'Neill was on the jury for the 2018 Scotiabank Giller Prize.

O'Neill's 2017 CLC Kreisel Lecture was published in 2018 by University of Alberta Press as Wisdom in Nonsense: Invaluable Lessons From My Father.

In 2019 O'Neill was awarded the Writers' Trust Fellowship for her body of work.

Awards
Winner of Canada Reads  2007
Winner of the Hugh MacLennan Prize for Fiction 2007
Shortlisted for the Governor General's Award 2007
Shortlisted for the Orange Prize for Fiction 2008
Shortlisted for the Amazon.ca/ Books in Canada First Novel Award 2007
Shortlisted for the Barnes and Noble Discover Great New Writers Award 2007
Shortlisted for the Grand Prix du Livre de Montreal 2007
Shortlisted for the Exclusive Books Boeke Prize South Africa 2008
Longlisted for the International Dublin Literary Award 2008
Winner, GOLD, National Magazine Awards, Best Feature Short (ELLE CANADA), 2010
Winner, GOLD, National Magazine Awards, Best Feature Short (CHATELAINE), 2011
Shortlisted for the Scotiabank Giller Prize 2014
Longlisted Baileys Women's Prize for Fiction 2015
Longlisted Encore Award 2015
Longlisted Frank O'Connor International Short Story Award 2015
Shortlisted for the Scotiabank Giller Prize 2015
Shortlisted the Hugh MacLennan Prize for Fiction 2015
Longlisted for the International Dublin Literary Award 2015
Winner Danuta Gleed Literary Award 2016
Shortlisted for the Sunburst Award 2016 
Longlisted Baileys Women's Prize for Fiction 2017
Winner of the Hugh MacLennan Prize for Fiction 2017
Winner of the Writers' Trust Fellowship 2019

Books
 two eyes are you sleeping, 1999 (poetry)
 Lullabies for Little Criminals, 2006 (novel)
 The Girl Who Was Saturday Night, 2014 (novel)
 Daydreams of Angels, 2015 (short stories)
 The Lonely Hearts Hotel, 2017 (novel)
 Wisdom in Nonsense: Invaluable Lessons from My Father, 2018 (nonfiction)
 When We Lost Our Heads, 2022 (novel)

Other work
O'Neill wrote the screenplay for the 2000 film St. Jude, directed by John L'Ecuyer and starring Liane Balaban and Nicholas Campbell. It debuted at the Toronto International Film Festival.

O'Neill has written a book of poetry entitled two eyes are you sleeping.

Her 2008 short story "The End of Pinky" was adapted as a 2013 animated short of the same name, with O'Neill providing English narration. In December 2013, it was named to the Toronto International Film Festival's annual top ten list, in the short film category.

References

21st-century Canadian novelists
21st-century Canadian poets
Canadian women poets
Canadian women screenwriters
Canadian women novelists
Living people
Writers from Montreal
Anglophone Quebec people
Montreal Gazette people
Canadian people of American descent
Canadian women short story writers
21st-century Canadian women writers
1973 births
21st-century Canadian short story writers
McGill University alumni
21st-century Canadian screenwriters